List of forts in Madhya Pradesh state in India
 Ahilya Fort
 Asirgarh Fort
 Bajrangarh Fort
 Bandhavgarh Fort
 Chanderi fort
 Dhar Fort
 Garh Kundar
 Ginnorgarh
 Gohad Fort
 Gwalior Fort
 Madan Mahal
 Mandsaur Fort
 Mandu fort complex
 Narwar Fort
 Orchha Fort complex
 Raisen Fort
 Sabalgarh Fort
 Utila Fort

References

Madhya Pradesh
 
Forts
F